Helfried Winger (b. 23 October 1921 - d. September 1998) was an Austrian ice hockey player. He competed in the men's tournament at the 1948 Winter Olympics.

References

External links
 

1921 births
1998 deaths
20th-century Austrian people
Austrian ice hockey players
Ice hockey people from Vienna
Ice hockey players at the 1948 Winter Olympics
Olympic ice hockey players of Austria